The Chinese Elm cultivar Ulmus parvifolia 'Drake' was marketed by the Monrovia Nursery of Azusa, California from 1952 to 1953.

Description
The tree has upright, spreading branches bearing dark-green leaves. 'Drake' is also distinguished by having a bark that begins exfoliating at a relatively young age .

Pests and diseases
The species and its cultivars are highly resistant, but not immune, to Dutch elm disease, and unaffected by the Elm Leaf Beetle Xanthogaleruca luteola.

Cultivation
'Drake' became the most popular form of U. parvifolia planted in the southern and western states of the United States. One specimen is known to have been introduced to Europe.

Synonymy
 Ulmus 'Brea': Keeline-Wilcox Nursery, Brea, California, Cat. Winter 1952.

Accessions
North America
U S National Arboretum , Washington, D.C., United States. Acc. no. 36533
Europe
Grange Farm Arboretum, Sutton St. James, Spalding, Lincolnshire, UK. One specimen, acc. no. 704.

Nurseries

North America

(Widely available)

References

External links
 Ulmus parvifolia cultivar list.
 'Drake' Chinese Elm

Chinese elm cultivar
Ulmus articles with images
Ulmus